is a Japanese actor and voice actor from Osaka. He is married to fellow Japanese voice actress Hitomi Oikawa since 1988, whose birth name is also . His former stage name is also , which uses the kanji of his given name, though pronounced "Ryō". He is best known for his role as Vegeta from the Dragon Ball series, Reinhard von Lohengramm from Legend of the Galactic Heroes, Andromeda Shun from Saint Seiya, Heiji Hattori from Detective Conan, and Captain Falcon in the Super Smash Bros. series.

Career
Horikawa started out as a child actor in elementary school. He made his debut in voice acting as Kenta Hirono, the protagonist of the 1984 anime Dream Soldier Wing-Man. From there, he became famous for his anime character roles as Andromeda Shun (Saint Seiya), Reinhard von Lohengramm (Legend of the Galactic Heroes), Vegeta (Dragon Ball series), and Heiji Hattori (Detective Conan). He is also well known for his game role as Captain Falcon (Super Smash Bros. series), with his most well-known line in the games being "Falcon Punch!". His wife is also a voice artist. He is also a fluent English speaker.

Filmography

Anime television series
1980s
Dr. Slump - Arale-chan (1984) (Charmy Yamada, Sakamoto)
Dream Soldier Wing-Man (1984) (Kenta Hirono)
Fist of the North Star (1984) (young Kenshiro)
GeGeGe no Kitarō (1985) (Jigoku Douji)
Dragon Ball (1986) (Charmy Yamada) 
Saint Seiya (1986) (Andromeda Shun)
Esper Mami (1987) (Boy)
Lady Lady!! (1987) (Arthur Drake Brighton)
Kiteretsu Daihyakka (1988) (Boy, Wolf, Dog, Boy A, Taro, Richard)
Dragon Ball Z (1989) (Vegeta, Vegetto)
Dragon Quest (1989) (Adonis)

1990s
YuYu Hakusho (1993) (Karasu)
Legend of the Swordmaster Yaiba (1993) (Takeshi Onimaru)
Ghost Sweeper Mikami (1993) (Tadao Yokoshima)
Pretty Soldier Sailor Moon S (1994) (Thomas Harris)
Kiteretsu Daihyakka (1994) (Mogubee)
Pretty Soldier Sailor Moon SuperS (1995) (Yoshiki Usui)
Nurse Angel Ririka SOS(1995) (Buros)
Phantom Thief Saint Tail (1995) (Misato)
Dragon Ball GT (1996) (Vegeta, Gogeta)
Detective Conan (1996) (Namigawa Katsuhiko, Heiji Hattori)
The Files of Young Kindaichi (1997) (Asa Kakimoto, Ohno, Tsukishima)
Trigun (1998) (E.G. Mine)
Yu-Gi-Oh! (1998) (Ryuichi Fuwa)
Pokémon (1999) (Ziggy)

2000s
Digimon Tamers (2001) (Makuramon)
The Twelve Kingdoms (2002) (Shisei)
Ashita no Nadja (2004) (Antonio Fabiani)
Konjiki no Gash Bell!! (2005) (Zaruchimu)
Kenichi: The Mightiest Disciple (2006) (Hermit)
Ojarumaru (2008) (Gorgeous)
Dragon Ball Kai (2009) (Vegeta, Vegetto)

2010s
Digimon Fusion (2012) (Phelesmon)
Samurai Flamenco (2014) (Heatnoid)
Dragon Ball Super (2015) (Vegeta, Vegetto)
Gintama: Porori Hen (2017) (Kusanagi)
Actors: Songs Connection (2019) (Kagetora Nagano)

2020s
Hairpin Double (2022) (Ken Horibe)

Original video animations (OVAs)
Legend of the Galactic Heroes (1988) (Reinhard von Lohengramm)
Vampire Princess Miyu (1988) (Kei Yuzuki)
Shin Captain Tsubasa (1989) (Jito Hiroshi)
Yagami-kun no Katei no Jijō (1990) (Futamura)
Slow Step (1991) (Naoto Kadomatsu)
Mobile Suit Gundam 0083: Stardust Memory (1991) (Kou Uraki)
Dragon Ball Z Side Story: Plan to Eradicate the Saiyans (1993) (Vegeta)
Please Save My Earth (1993) (Hokuto Yakushimaru)
Iczer Girl Iczelion (1994) (Chaos)
Kizuna (1994) (Kai Sagano)
Kizuna 2 (1994) (Kai Sagano)
Kizuna: Bonds of Love (1994) (Kai Sagano)
Ultraman: Super Fighter Legend (1996) (Ultraman Taro)
Detective Conan (2000) (Heiji Hattori)
Kizuna: Bonds of Love (2001) (Kai Sagano)
Dragon Ball: Yo! Son Goku and His Friends Return!! (2008) (Vegeta)

Theatrical animation
 Toki no Tabibito -Time Stranger- (1986) (Mori Ranmaru)
 Maison Ikkoku Kanketsu-Hen (1988) (Nozomu Nikaido)
 The Five Star Stories (1989) (Amaterasu/Ladios Sopp)
 Dragon Ball Z: The Return of Cooler (1992) (Vegeta)
 Dragon Ball Z: Super Android 13! (1992) (Vegeta)
 Dragon Ball Z: Broly - The Legendary Super Saiyan (1993) (Vegeta)
 Dragon Ball Z: Bojack Unbound (1993) (Vegeta)
 Dragon Ball Z: Fusion Reborn (1995) (Vegeta, Gogeta)
 Dragon Ball Z: Wrath of the Dragon (1995) (Vegeta)
 Dragon Ball Z: Battle of Gods (2013) (Vegeta)
 Dragon Ball Z: Resurrection 'F' (2015) (Vegeta)
 Dragon Ball Super: Broly (2018) (Vegeta, Gogeta)
 Dragon Ball Super: Super Hero (2022) (Vegeta)

Video games
 Astal (Geist)
 Abalaburn (Lemuria)
 Super Smash Bros. (Captain Falcon)
 Super Smash Bros. Melee (Captain Falcon)
 Another Century's Episode 2 (Kou Uraki)
 Detective Conan: Tsuioku no Mirajiyu (Heiji Hattori)
 Dissidia Final Fantasy Opera Omnia (Edward)
 Dragon Ball Z series (Vegeta, Vegetto, Gogeta)
 Double Dragon II: The Revenge PC Engine version (Billy Lee)
 Final Fantasy IV (Edward, Zeromus)
 Super Smash Bros. Brawl (Captain Falcon)
 J-Stars Victory VS (Vegeta)
 Super Smash Bros. for Nintendo 3DS and Wii U (Captain Falcon, Dunban)
 Kunio no Oden (Kunio, Godai, Sonokawa)
 Super Dodge Ball (Kunio)
 Langrisser I & II (Ledin)
 Makeruna! Makendō 2 (Doro‑san)
 Power Stone (Falcon)
 Power Stone 2 (Falcon)
 Shining Force EXA (Ragnadaam III)
 Star Ocean: The Second Story (Dias Flac, Bowman Jean)
 Super Robot Wars series (Kou Uraki)
 Tales of Destiny (Miktran)
 Lost Odyssey (Tolten)
 Xenoblade Chronicles (Dunban)
 Super Smash Bros. Ultimate (Captain Falcon, Dunban)
 Phantasy Star Online 2 (Kyokuya)

Tokusatsu
 B-Fighter Kabuto (Heat Fruit Beast Pineappler (ep. 19))
 Tetsuwan Tantei Robotack (Speedam/Speedy Wonder)
 Samurai Sentai Shinkenger (Akumaro Sujigarano (eps. 28 - 43))
 Unofficial Sentai Akibaranger Season Two (General Two/Tsuguo Ushirozawa)
 Kamen Rider Revice (Himself (ep. 31), Juuga Driver)

Drama CDs
 Abunai series 3: Abunai Bara to Yuri no Sono
 Abunai series 4: Abunai Campus Love (Ayumu Izaki)
 Catch Me! (Tatsuki Kanou)
 Ginnoyuki Furufuru (Yukihiko Takagi)
 Que Sera, Sera (Fujito Mura)
 Shiawase ni Naroune (Tokio Mouri)
 Sweet Summer Supplies (Tokio Mouri)

Dubbing
 Thomas and Friends (Henry the Green Engine (Seasons 1-8), Mavis the Quarry Diesel (Season 5 only) and Oliver the Big Excavator, (Season 6 only))
 Thomas and the Magic Railroad (Henry the Green Engine)
 Dir En Grey's Arche (Trailer)
 The New Adventures of Batman (Robin / Dick Grayson)
 The Lord of the Rings (Pippin Took)
 Mr. Men (Mr. Mean)
 Underdogs (Grosso)
 Snow White's Adventures (Doppy)

Voice/Recording Director
 Exit
 Xenoblade Chronicles

References

External links
 
 

1958 births
Living people
Male voice actors from Osaka Prefecture
Japanese male stage actors
Japanese male video game actors
Japanese male voice actors
Japanese voice directors
Aoni Production voice actors
20th-century Japanese male actors
21st-century Japanese male actors